Santa Cruz Tayata  is a town and municipality in Oaxaca in south-western Mexico. The municipality covers an area of  km². 
It is part of the Tlaxiaco District in the south of the Mixteca Region.

As of the 2010 census, the town (locality), which serves as the municipal seat, had a population of 59 inhabitants, while the municipality had a total population of 608 inhabitants. The municipal seat is the third-smallest in all of Mexico (after Santa María del Rosario and Santa María Nduayaco).

References

Municipalities of Oaxaca